is a Japanese female foil fencer.

She qualified to the 2012 Summer Olympics as a member of the top-ranked Asian team. In the individual event, she defeated Hong Kong's Lin Po Heung in the first round, then lost 8-14 to five-time Olympic champion Valentina Vezzali of Italy. In the team event Japan was crushed 17–45 by Russia in the first round and placed 7th after the ranking matches. Nishioka fenced only against Russia.

At the 2016 Summer Olympics, she competed in the individual foil only, as there was no women's team event.

She took up fencing at the age of 12.

References

1989 births
Living people
Japanese female foil fencers
Olympic fencers of Japan
Fencers at the 2012 Summer Olympics
Fencers at the 2016 Summer Olympics
Asian Games medalists in fencing
Fencers at the 2010 Asian Games
People from Wakayama (city)
Fencers at the 2014 Asian Games
Asian Games silver medalists for Japan
Asian Games bronze medalists for Japan
Medalists at the 2010 Asian Games
Medalists at the 2014 Asian Games
20th-century Japanese women
21st-century Japanese women